is a railway station in the city of Kariya, Aichi Prefecture, Japan, jointly operated by Central Japan Railway Company (JR Tōkai) and the private railway operator  Meitetsu.

Lines
Kariya Station is served by the Tōkaidō Main Line, and is located 341.6 kilometers from the starting point of the line at Tokyo Station. It is also served by the Meitetsu Mikawa Line and is 25.2 kilometers from the terminus of that line at Sanage Station and 3.6 kilometers from Chiryū.

Station layout

JR
The JR station consists of two elevated island platforms serving four tracks, with the station building underneath, The station building has automated ticket machines, TOICA automated turnstiles and is staffed.

Meitetsu

The Meitetsu station consists of a single ground-level island platform connected to the JR portion of the station by a footbridge. The station has automatic turnstiles for the Tranpass system of magnetic fare cards, and is staffed.

Adjacent stations

Station history

Kariya Station opened on September 1, 1888, when the section of the Japanese Government Railways (JGR) connecting Hamamatsu Station with Ōbu Station was completed. This line was named the Tōkaidō Line in 1895 and the Tōkaidō Main Line in 1909. On February 5, 1914, the privately owned Mikawa Railway built a station for the Mikawa Line adjacent to this station, and named it . The two stations were merged on February 10, 1927. The Mikawa Railway became part of Meitetsu in 1941, and the JGR became the Japanese National Railways (JNR) after World War II. All freight operations were shifted to the nearby Kariya Container Center in 1986. With the privatization and dissolution of the JNR on April 1, 1987, the station came under the control of JR Central.

Station numbering was introduced to the section of the Tōkaidō Line operated JR Central in March 2018; Kariya Station was assigned station number CA58.

Passenger statistics
In fiscal 2017, the JR portion of the station was used by an average of 35,077 passengers daily (arriving passengers only) and the Meitetsu portion of the station was used by 27,483 passengers (daily).

Surrounding area
 Kariya City Hall
Kariya Art Museum
Denso head office
Aishin Seiki head office

See also
 List of Railway Stations in Japan

References

Yoshikawa, Fumio. Tokaido-sen 130-nen no ayumi. Grand-Prix Publishing (2002) .

External links

JR-Tokai home page 
Meitetsu home page 

Railway stations in Japan opened in 1888
Railway stations in Aichi Prefecture
Tōkaidō Main Line
Stations of Central Japan Railway Company
Stations of Nagoya Railroad
Kariya, Aichi